The 2022 Cupa României Final was the final match of the 2021–22 Cupa României and the 84th final of the Cupa României, Romania's premier football cup competition. It was played on 19 May 2022 between Sepsi OSK and Voluntari.

Sepsi OSK claimed its first cup after a 2–1 victory in regular time. Marius Ștefănescu scored a double for the Sfântu Gheorghe side, and was thus named Man of the Match. It was the second appearance in the final stage of the competition for both clubs, with Voluntari winning the 2016–17 edition.

The Final was the first notable event hosted by the new Stadionul Rapid-Giulești in Bucharest, which was inaugurated two months prior to the game.

Route to the Final

Match

References

External links
Official site 

2022
2021–22 in Romanian football
2021–22 Cupa României